Lorne Maxime Jr. (born 16 September 1992) is a United States Virgin Islands international footballer who plays as a forward and studied at the Buffalo State College.

Career statistics

International

References

External links
 Lorne Maxime at CaribbeanFootballDatabase

1992 births
Living people
United States Virgin Islands soccer players
United States Virgin Islands international soccer players
Association football forwards
Buffalo State Bengals men's soccer players